BottleRocket Entertainment was a third-party video game developer founded by Jay Beard (previously head of San Diego Studio), composed primarily of former San Diego Studio employees and animators. Many of them worked on The Mark of Kri before the studio was formed.

BottleRocket Entertainment was developing Splatterhouse, a beat'em up title in the Splatterhouse franchise by Namco Bandai, but was removed from the project after an unspecified "performance issue" caused a split. Several former BottleRocket employees accepted new positions within Namco Bandai continuing their work on the title.

BottleRocket Entertainment was reported to be developing a licensed title for Brash Entertainment, which was cancelled when Brash went out of business. A source in Kotaku revealed the game to be DC Comics character The Flash. Footage of the cancelled title was posted on YouTube by a former employee of BottleRocket Entertainment.

Jay Beard announced in an email to Kotaku that, "after fighting to keep the doors open for the past six months we have decided to close and move on." The company was officially closed on September 3, 2009, and Beard is reported to be "building a new development studio from the ground up." Beard currently works as an art director for Amazon Game Studios.

List of BottleRocket Entertainment games
Rise of the Kasai - 2005 (PS2)
Xiaolin Showdown

References

External links
Company profile at GameSpy.com
Company profile at jobs.gamasutra.com

Defunct video game companies of the United States
Video game development companies